This is a list of the songs that reached number one in Mexico in 1965, according to Billboard magazine with data provided by Audiomusica.

Chart History

By country of origin
Number-one artists:

Number-one compositions (it denotes the country of origin of the song's composer[s]; in case the song is a cover of another one, the name of the original composition is provided in parentheses):

See also
1965 in music

References

Sources
Print editions of the Billboard magazine from January 9, 1965 to January 1, 1966.

1965 in Mexico
1965 record charts
Lists of number-one songs in Mexico